San José de la Salle is one of the most traditional schools in Medellín and the first school of the La Salle brothers in Colombia.

History
San José school was founded by La Salle brothers in 1890, in the city of Medellín. The brothers first arrived in Aburrá Valley, then went to Barranquilla, and then to Puerto Berrio in the department of Antioquia and finally they arrived in Copacabana. This community started classes on April 7, 1890. In 1907 the first group received their bachelor's degrees. In 1911 the Biology Museum of the school was founded by Brother Nicéforo Maria.

The first location of this school was behind the Hotel Nutibara, on the street Caracas with the street Palace in the downtown of Medellín. In 1940 the school celebrated the fiftieth anniversary of foundation with all community and the education minister Jorge Eliécer Gaitan. The flag, the shield and the anthem were adopted as symbols.
In 1955 the school changed location from Medellín downtown to  a new campus with more commodity than the old one behind Nutibara hotel. This location was named "Morro de Cuatro Vientos". In the same year the school received the Boyacá Cross when brother Ignacio Felipe was the principal. In 1974 the school, which had accepted only boys, changed this policy and started also accepting girls when the principal brother Andres Rosero Bolaños founded the kindergarten.  In 1976 the school received the Antioquia Star. In 1980 it celebrated his first twenty five years there.

In 1990 the school celebrated one century of the foundation of San José School. It was an important celebration for the community of La Salle because also was one century of La Salle in Colombia.  In this year the school received important recognitions of many institutions in Colombia and Antioquia.

In 2005 the school celebrated the fiftieth anniversary of the campus on "Morro de Cuatro Vientos". In 2007 the school changed the location to a modern place with all technologies in La Cola del Zorro, in the district of Poblado in Medellín.

School Principals
 Brother  Julio, 1890–1892
 Brother  Filemón, 1893–1894
 Brother  Juan Teodoro, 1895–1903, 1916–1918
 Brother  Amós María, 1904
 Brother  Antonio Dionisio, 1905–1913, 1925
 Brother Atanasio Pablo, 1914-1915.
 Brother Salustiano, 1919.
 Brother Marcos, 1920-1924.
 Brother Gervasio Elías, 1926–1930, 1933-1937.
 Brother Gaspar María, 1931–1932, 1941.
 Brother Norberto, 1942-1945.
 Brother Ignacio Felipe, 1946-1957.
 Brother Arnoldo, 1958–1961, 1971.
 Brother Daniel de la Inmaculada, 1962-1964.
 Brother Néstor Suárez Alzate, 1965–1970
 Brother Andrés Rosero Bolaños, 1972-1974.
 Brother Octavio Martinez Lopez, 1975–1978, 1982–1983, 1988-1991.
 Brother Néstor Maya Uribe, July- December 1983.
 Brother Octavio Sanchez, 1984.
 Brother Jaime Augusto Bedoya, 1985-1987.
 Brother Jairo Lopez Correa, 1992-1995.
 José María Ruiz Galeano, 1996-1999.
 Brother Alvaro Llano Ruiz, 1978–1982, 2000-2008.
 Brother Henry Ramirez Romero, 2009-2010.
 Brother Leandro Vallejo Vallejo, 2011-2016
 Eliecer de Hoyos 2017-2020
 Diana Stella Aguirre Grajales 2021-

See also

References

Web
sanjosedelasalle.edu.co

1890 establishments in Colombia
Buildings and structures in Medellín
Schools in Colombia